A toolbox (also called toolkit, tool chest or workbox) is a box to organize, carry, and protect the owner's tools. They could be used for trade, a hobby or DIY, and their contents vary with the craft.

Types

A toolbox could refer to several types of storage to hold tools. It could mean a small portable box that can carry a few tools to a project location or a large storage system set on casters. Modern toolboxes are predominantly metal or plastic.  Wood was the material of choice for toolboxes built beginning in the early 19th century.

Toolboxes can be mainly divided as 5 types. They are:

 Plastic
 Steel
 Aluminium 
 Waterproof        
 Cantilever

Small portable toolboxes are sometimes called hand boxes or portable tool storage. Most portable toolboxes have one handle on top and a lid that opens on a hinge. Many have a removable tote tray that sits on a flange inside the lip of the box, with a single larger compartment below. The tote tray helps organize smaller parts and accessories. Portable toolboxes sometimes use slide-out trays or cantilever trays in lieu of the removable tote tray. Metal toolboxes (typically steel) weigh more than plastic ones.  A plastic toolbox laden with tools can weigh the same as a comparable steel box does when empty.  Metal boxes are also subject to rusting and their sharp edges can mark the surfaces of things they are banged against.  Metal is, however, known for being stronger than plastic, so one should balance its disadvantages against the need to withstand abuse and support the weight of many tools.

Portable chests are a type of tool storage that is small enough to carry, but has drawers to organize contents. Portable chests have a handle on top for portability and a top lid that opens on hinges. Portable chests typically have 3-4 drawers. Most are made from metal, but some have a plastic shell with metal drawers in order to help lighten the piece.

A toolbox can also refer to a large tool storage system, or tool chest combos, that includes multiple pieces. These systems are almost always made from metal. Most tool storage systems are painted steel, but some are stainless steel and aluminum. They include a top chest that has drawers and a top lid that opens on a hinge. The top chest is designed to sit on a cabinet, also called a rolling cabinet (rollcab) or rollaway. The cabinet sits on four or more casters and has drawers to organize tools. Other pieces can be added to the system or combo. A middle chest, also called an intermediate chest, can be placed between the top chest and cabinet for extra storage. A side cabinet with more drawers can be hung from the side of a cabinet. A side locker can also be hung from the side of a cabinet; usually with a door that protects shelves or small drawers.

Toolcarts (also known as rollcabs) are commonly used in the transportation industry for maintenance and repair of vehicles on location. Used as portable work stations, some of the larger types are self powered and propelled, for example, pit carts in automobile racing.

After several decades of decline in popularity, today a resurgence in use is underway. Viewed by many as intended primarily for specialized craftsmanship, such as machinists, tool and die makers, jewelers and other specialized craftsmen, they are also sought after by average tradesman and collectors as working heirloom. Many toolboxes and chests from a variety of trades can be seen at the Smithsonian Museum of American History.

Material
Tool chests are primarily made of metal, though some expensive models are made of hardwoods.

Alternatives to toolboxes

 Toolsets: These are molded plastic cases typically containing a variety of household or automotive tools.  Each item snaps into a designated spot in the case, which makes organizing tools much easier than with a conventional toolbox.  They are very compact, lightweight, and inexpensive relative to purchasing tools and a toolbox separately.  There are two major disadvantages: no ability to customize the selection of tools (sometimes the tools are of lower quality than what one might purchase individually); and little or no space to add new tools and supplies.  Thus one still might need a toolbox in addition to the toolset.

 Toolbelts and aprons: Though at the far extreme of portability, they are insufficient for storing a large number of tools.  One might use a toolbox for permanent storage and a toolbelt or apron to take just what is needed for a job.  They are used in locations where a worker needs access to more tools than he can carry with just his hands while working in a location with no place to set tools down, such as working on a ladder or hanging from a utility pole.   
Tool chest: A large single, or stacked metal cabinet with multiple doors that can accommodate large amounts of assorted light and heavy tools, as well as other repair equipment.
Tool Bag: Tool bags are often made of heavy canvas and leather. Some tool bags have a hinged steel frame around the opening. This allows the bag to stay open when in use. Many tool bags have pockets on the inside and or outside. They usually include handles and sometimes shoulder straps. Tool bags often have a firm, reinforced bottom panel. Tool bags may have a zipper or leather strap closure. Tool bags closely resemble medical bags.
Bucket organizers: These consist of rugged fabric or polyester bags draped into and around a 5-gallon bucket. They are lightweight, inexpensive, and can rival the toolbox as a means of storing and moving tools to a job site. Their dozens of pockets permit better organization, yet nearly everything is visible at first glance.  That, however, could be a disadvantage as well, since one may have privacy or security concerns if the bucket has to be left in a public area. By contrast, toolboxes are often lockable and, obviously, opaque. In a vehicle, the bucket may be jostled and spill some of its contents. Tools left outdoors are also better protected from the elements in a toolbox.
 "Autocarts": These are utility carts having a pivoting base for storage in vehicles. They are used by tradespersons to carry tools, equipment or supplies. They combine the advantages of toolboxes and toolbelts and are essentially portable truckboxes or transportable shopping carts.
 "Workshop trolley": This is a tool cabinet with wheels, and, because of that, the tools can be easily moved from A to B. Usually you will find these mobile cabinets in workshops of mechanics.

In computing
The term toolbox is used in computing to represent a set of subroutines (or functions) and global variables. Typically these implement missing functionality using capabilities available in the core software.

See also
Gang box
Repair kit
Organizer box

References

External links

Containers